Luciobarbus setivimensis is a ray-finned fish species in the family Cyprinidae.

It is found only in Algeria. Its natural habitat are rivers, water storage areas, and canals and ditches. It is not considered a threatened species by the IUCN.

The taxonomy and systematics of the Maghreb barbs are subject to considerable dispute. Some authors consider L. setivimensis a distinct species, while others include it in the Algerian barb (L. callensis).

References

Luciobarbus
Endemic fauna of Algeria
Fish described in 1842
Taxonomy articles created by Polbot